XHS-FM (branded as W Radio) is a Mexican Spanish-language radio station that serves the Tampico, Tamaulipas, Mexico market area.

History
XES-AM received its concession in 1932 and initially broadcast on 1055 kHz. Originally owned by Fernando Sada, XES was sold to Difusora Porteña, S. de R.L., in 1938, and to Radio Televisora de Tampico, the current concessionaire, in 1951. It also moved frequencies to 1240 AM.

XES migrated to FM in 2012.

Until July 30, 2021, the station carried Christian programming under the name "Radio Unción", in addition to W Radio programming.

External links
 wradio.com.mx

References

Radio stations in Tampico